Nong Hin railway station is a railway station located in Khlong Wan Subdistrict, Prachuap Khiri Khan City, Prachuap Khiri Khan.

Due to minimal passenger usage, Nong Hin is being converted railway halt and will officially be in operation when the double tracking of the line section is completed.

Train services 
 Ordinary 254/255 Lang Suan-Thon Buri-Lang Suan

References 
 
 

Railway stations in Thailand